Solnechny is a rural locality (a settlement) in Zavetilyichyovsky Selsoviet, Aleysky District, Altai Krai, Russia. The population was 839 as of 2013. There are 18 streets.

Geography 
Solnechny is located on the Gorevka River, 4 km north of Aleysk (the district's administrative centre) by road. Aleysk is the nearest rural locality.

References 

Rural localities in Aleysky District